CFH may refer to:

Coach Fred Hoiberg, Iowa State University men's basketball coach
 Complement Factor H, a complement control protein
NHS Connecting for Health, The UK Agency delivering the NHS National Programme for IT, usually written "CfH"
Chase Farm Hospital, a hospital in London
Call for Help, an American/Canadian television show about computing and technology
Continue from home, an email title sent in medium/wide spread, indicating that the sender is continuing his work from home
Cowboys from Hell, a groove metal album by Pantera
Unit of gas flow of standard cubic feet per hour. 
Clifton Hills Landing Strip, IATA airport code "CFH"